The Gonda Building is a medical building owned by the Mayo Clinic in Rochester, Minnesota, and designed by Ellerbe Becket Architects and Engineers.

It rises 305 feet (93 m) in 21 floors, and was completed in 2001. At the time it was the tallest building in Rochester, and was surpassed in 2004 by Broadway Plaza.

The Gonda building was the largest building project in the Mayo Clinic's history, the Leslie & Susan Gonda Building was constructed in three phases to a height of 21 stories. A fourth phase is planned for completion in the 2020s.  Located at the heart of the campus, Gonda is the centerpiece of Mayo's integrated practice.

In 2018, the Mayo Clinic announced a $190 million expansion of the Gonda Building which will add 11 stories to its height, including four new floors of clinical space and a seven-story hotel expected to be completed in 2022, bringing its expected total height to nearly 500 feet, making it again- by far- the tallest building in the city. However, in the midst of the COVID-19 pandemic, the Mayo Clinic and developer Pontiac Land Group placed the project on indefinite hold.

The Gonda Building is physically conjoined on its South side to the Mayo Building although the floors do not match perfectly.

See also
List of tallest buildings in Minnesota
List of tallest buildings in Rochester, Minnesota

References

Mayo Clinic buildings
Skyscrapers in Rochester, Minnesota
Buildings and structures completed in 2001